Jill Saward (born 9 December 1953) is a British singer, musician and composer, best known for being the lead voice of the English jazz-funk band, Shakatak.

Career
She began her musical career at the age of 16, with the British progressive jazz rock band Fusion Orchestra, from 1969 to 1975.

Jill Saward and Fusion Orchestra gained a following of fans who secured a record deal with EMI music to produce their first album Skeleton in Armour, an album that immediately received critical acclaim upon its debut, and is now considered a collector's item which is highly sought after.

After the band Fusion Orchestra split, Saward became involved in a new all female group, called Brandy. The band, produced by Polydor, was active for about three years in the UK and Europe, before disbanding in 1976.

Saward was spotted later by the band leader Nicky North who invited her to perform in the 'Cats Whiskers' with his own big soul funk band. She also made a name for herself as one of the UK's session singers at that time. Saward also had a brief stint with a musical group of all women, called Citizen Gang, built by a French manufacturer of Orpheus Productions, and still managed to collaborate with the Nicky North Band. It was in this period she met band, Nigel Wright and Roger Odell, who are still components of jazz-funk band Shakatak.

It was through Shakatak that Saward was able to record some vocals on an experimental track of a song called "Steppin'", and after nine top ten hits Saward was invited to be a permanent part of the group and started to tour worldwide.

She became the leading voice of Shakatak sharing success for more than 35 years. The band is still touring and recording and still popular around the world, especially in Europe and the Far East. They usually publish a new album every two years for JVC Records and Secret Records.

Despite constant touring and recording, Saward has always managed to find time to develop new projects, and still continues to write and record new material.

Private life
She has been married with the bass player George Anderson, also a member of Shakatak, with whom she had two sons, Luis and James. They divorced in 2001.

In 2008 the Shakatak frontwoman starred in the reality TV show Living TV's Pop Goes The Band, a show which sees former musical stars such as Bucks Fizz, Bananarama, Visage, Cleopatra, 911, Chaka Khan and more, undergoing surgery in a bid to relaunch their careers.

In addition to her music career, Jill is an abstract impressionist artist who specializes in photographic prints.

Discography

Jill Saward (solo albums)
 1999: Just for You
 2016: Just for You (remastered with three bonus tracks)
Jill Saward: all lead and BV voices
Jason Rebello, Neil Drinkwater, and Chris Ingham: keyboards
Snake Davis, Aaron Liddard, Matt Sibley, Derek Nash: saxophone
Fridrik Karlson: guitar
George Anderson: bass

 2016: M Is for Manhattan
 2016: Endless Summer
Jill Saward: lead voice
Aaron Liddard: saxophone
Chris Ingham: keyboard
Chris Johnson: vocals
George Anderson: bass
James Saward Anderson: vocals
Mornington Lockett: saxophone
Patrick Hartley: trombone
Roberto Tola: guitar
Simon Allen: saxophone
Steve Dee: bass
Teresa Green: backing vocals

With Fusion Orchestra
 1973: Skeleton in Armour – recorded at Abbey Road Studios

With Brandy
 1977: Ooh Ya

With Citizen Gang
 1979: Citizen Gang
 1979: "Womanly Way"

With Shakatak

Albums
 1981: Drivin' Hard
 1982: Night Birds
 1982: Invitations
 1983: Out of This World
 1984: Down on the Street
 1984: Shakatak Live in Japan (live)
 1985: Live! (Febbraio 1985) (live)
 1985: City Rhythm
 1986: Into the Blue (pubblicato in Giappone)
 1987: Golden Wings (pubblicato in Giappone)
 1987: Never Stop Your Love
 1988: Manic and Cool
 1988: Da Makani (pubblicato in Giappone)
 1988: The Very Best of Shakatak
 1989: Niteflite (pubblicato in Giappone)
 1989: Turn the Music Up
 1990: Fiesta (pubblicato in Giappone)
 1990: Christmas Eve (pubblicato in Giappone)
 1991: Bitter Sweet
 1991: Utopia (pubblicato in Giappone)
 1993: Street Level
 1993: Under the Sun
 1993: The Christmas Album
 1994: Full Circle
 1997: Let the Piano Play
 1998: View from the City
 1998: Live at Ronnie Scott's
 2001: Under Your Spell

 2003: Blue Savannah
 2005: Easier Said Than Done (live album)
 2005: Beautiful Day
 2007: Emotionally Blue
 2009: Afterglow
 2011: Across the World
 2014: On the Corner
 2016 Times and Places

Compilation albums

 1988: The Coolest Cuts
 1990: Perfect Smile (Issued in the US only)
 1991: Open Your Eyes (Issued in the US only, with one track, "Hungry")
 1991: Remix Best Album
 1991: Night Moves
 1996: The Collection
 1996: Jazz Connections Volumes 1–6 (Six compilation albums of their exclusive Japanese albums from the 1980s and early 1990s)

 1998: Shinin' On
 1999: Magic
 1999: Jazz in the Night
 2000: The Collection Volume 2
 2002: Dinner Jazz
 2003: Smooth Solos
 2008: The Best of Shakatak
 2008: The Ultimate Collection
 2009: The Coolest Cuts 12" Mixes Volume 1
 2009: The Coolest Cuts 12" Mixes Volume 2
 2012: The 12 Inch Mixes
 2013: More 12 Inch Mixes
 2014: Snowflakes & Jazzamatazz
 A three-part compilation album set, compiled by Roger Odell:
 Sunset Jazz
 After Dark
 Drive Time

Singles

Videos
 1984: Twilight Sensation [Laserdisc]
 1986: The Purely Music Concert Series [Laserdisc]
 2004: Live at the Playhouse [DVD]
 2004: In Concert [DVD]
 2005: Live at Duo Music Exchange [DVD]

References

External links
 Jill Saward site official JillSaward.org
 Shakatak site official www.Shakatak.com
 Jill Saward discography and album reviews, credits & releases at AllMusic
 Jill Saward discography, album releases & credits at Discogs
 Jill Saward albums to be listened as stream on Spotify
 "A Man Like You" (1978) video on YouTube
 "Just for You" (1999) video on YouTube
 Jill Saward & Bill Sharpe Interview on YouTube
 Shakatak live in Japan 2005 video on YouTube

1953 births
Living people
English jazz singers
British women jazz singers
Singers from London
Shakatak members